Harold James Kane (November 28, 1896 – April 10, 1976) was an American football guard who played one season in the American Professional Football Association with the Rochester Jeffersons.

References

External links
Just Sports Stats

1896 births
1976 deaths
Players of American football from New York (state)
American football guards
Rochester Jeffersons players
sportspeople from Rochester, New York